Jeanette Boahemaa Kwakye  (pronounced kwah-chee; born 20 March 1983) is a sports broadcaster and retired British sprinter.

Athletics career
Kwakye won a bronze medal in the 4x100 metres relay at the 2002 World Junior Championships, with teammates Jade Lucas-Read, Amy Spencer and Vernicha James. At the 2007 European Indoor Championships she finished fourth in the 60 metres. In the semi-final she recorded a time of 7.17 seconds, this being the fastest time by a British woman in the 60m since 1986.

Kwakye, became the 2007 British Champion over 100m in a time of 11.59, beating Laura Turner (who recorded the same time) and defending champion Joice Maduaka. The next day, she also won the 200m title, after beating Emily Freeman and Donna Fraser, who took silver and bronze, respectively.

In the 2008 IAAF World Indoor Championships in Valencia, Kwakye equalled the British 60m record of 7.13 by Beverly Kinch in her semi-final before breaking it with a 7.08 run to claim silver behind American Angela Williams who won in 7.06, this placing Kwakye as number 2 in the 2008 world female rankings.

On 12 July 2008, Kwakye defended her British 100m title, whilst also winning the Olympic trials, and was accordingly automatically selected to compete at the 2008 Summer Olympics. Her time of 11.26 equalled her then lifetime best.

2008 Summer Olympics
In the heats of the 100 metres, Kwakye finished in second place behind Torri Edwards, clocking a time of 11.30 seconds, allowing her to progress through to the quarter-final stage. In the quarter-final, she was beaten to the line by Shelly-Ann Fraser and Evgeniya Polyakova, but still qualified for the semi-final by finishing in third place. In the semi-final on 17 August 2008, Kwakye finished third, with a time of 11.19. She became the first British woman to reach the 100 metres final since Heather Oakes in 1984. At these Olympics, Kwakye was also the only European athlete to appear in the final. In the final, she clocked 11.14, a personal best, to finish in sixth place, ahead of Debbie Ferguson-McKenzie of the Bahamas and Torri Edwards of the US.

Great Britain reached the final of the 4x100 metres relay, and along with the Jamaican team, were favourites to claim a medal. Kwakye ran a good first bend in the final, but the British team failed to finish due to a mix-up in the changeover between Montell Douglas and Emily Freeman. Jamaica also failed to finish after a similar error between Sherone Simpson and Kerron Stewart.

Injury
After Beijing 2008, Kwakye suffered from Achilles tendon and knee injuries, missing the 2010 athletics season. She returned to competition in 2011 and became the British 100m champion.
Kwakye reached the semi-final of the Women's 100m at the 2011 World Championships, in Daegu, South Korea.
In 2012 Kwakye won the British 60m Indoor title, but failed to qualify for the London 2012 Olympic Games due to injury. She did not compete in 2013.

Kwakye announced her retirement from competition in January 2014.

Personal life
Both of Kwakye's parents were born in the Brong-Ahafo Region of Ghana. The Kwakye family moved to England in the early 1980s. Kwakye's younger brother, Louis, is also involved in National athletics. Her younger sister, Chelsea, is the co-author of 'Taking Up Space', a Penguin (Merky Books) book released in 2020.

Kwakye is a graduate of Loughborough University where she attained a degree in Politics and Economics. She is close friends with singer Estelle.

Kwakye was the lead trainer on the set for 2012 British film Fast Girls, training Lily James and Lenora Crichlow for their respective roles as athletes. She also featured in 2012 documentary film Personal Best.

In October 2016 Jeanette was part of a consortium involved with a take over of English National League football team Dagenham & Redbridge.

In 2017, Kwakye self-published a children's book, Femi the Fox.

Broadcasting career 
After retiring, Kwakye studied for an NCTJ qualification and began working for BBC Radio Berkshire, before joining BBC Radio London's sports team in 2014.

Kwakye is a regular host of BBC Radio 5 Live's Football Daily podcast and covers for 5 Live Sport. She is also a regular contributor to Ian Wright's podcast, Wrighty's House.

Kwakye has presented various sports programmes for BBC Sport, including the 2018 Youth Olympic Games, World swimming championships 2019, World  athletics championships 2019, The Women's Football Show and reported for BBC Sports Personality of the Year 2019. She is the BBC's athletics trackside reporter.

Kwakye previously presented a weekly hour long show at 1:00pm each Saturday on BBC Radio London entitled The Women's Sport Show.

In December 2020, Kwakye was announced as Channel 5's lead presenter for their boxing coverage.

Kwakye is a keen writer and has been published by The Guardian, the Daily Mirror and BT Sport. Kwakye also works for the Youth Sport Trust as an Athlete Mentor on the Sky Sports Changing Lives program. She was also a reporter for the Sky Sports children's TV Show Game Changers from 2013 until 2019.

Kwakye was appointed Member of the Order of the British Empire (MBE) in the 2021 Birthday Honours for services to sport and sports broadcasting.

Personal bests
Updated 26 April 2009

All information taken from IAAF profile.

See also
List of British champions in 100 metres
List of British champions in 200 metres

References

External links

Jeanette's Rising Star profile on spikesmag.com
Jeanette Kwakye (BBC Radio London)

1983 births
Living people
People from the London Borough of Waltham Forest
Athletes from London
English female sprinters
British female sprinters
Olympic female sprinters
Olympic athletes of Great Britain
Athletes (track and field) at the 2008 Summer Olympics
World Athletics Championships athletes for Great Britain
World Athletics Indoor Championships medalists
British Athletics Championships winners
Alumni of Loughborough University
English people of Ghanaian descent
Black British sportswomen
Members of the Order of the British Empire